David Amigo Calamardo (born 22 October 2002) is a Spanish footballer who plays as a winger for CF Fuenlabrada.

Club career
After representing CP Parla Escuela, Amigo moved to CF Fuenlabrada's youth setup in 2016. He made his senior debut with the latter's reserves on 2 May 2021, coming on as a half-time substitute in a 3–1 Preferente de Madrid away win against CD Fortuna.

Amigo made his first team debut on 19 May 2021, as he replaced Jano in a 0–1 away loss against UD Logroñés in the Segunda División championship. Four days later he scored his first senior goal, netting the B's opener in a 3–1 home win against CD Humanes.

On 24 November 2022, Amigo renewed with Fuenla until 2025.

References

External links

Resultados Fútbol profile 

2002 births
Living people
People from Parla
Spanish footballers
Footballers from the Community of Madrid
Association football wingers
Segunda División players
Primera Federación players
Tercera Federación players
Divisiones Regionales de Fútbol players
CF Fuenlabrada B players
CF Fuenlabrada footballers